Abag Banner (Mongolian:   Abaɣ-a qosiɣu) is a county of Inner Mongolia, People's Republic of China. It is under the administration of Xilin Gol League. Abag Mongols live here. The local dialect has variously been classified as Chakhar or Khalkha.

Climate
Abag Banner has a monsoon-influenced, continental semi-arid climate (Köppen BSk), with very cold and dry winters, very warm, somewhat humid summers, and strong winds, especially in spring. There are 3,017 hours of bright sunshine annually, with each of the winter months having over two-thirds of the possible total, and this percentage falling to 60 in July.

References

Bibliography
www.xzqh.org 
 Sečenbaγatur, Qasgerel, Tuyaγ-a, B. ǰirannige, U Ying ǰe. 2005. Mongγul kelen-ü nutuγ-un ayalγun-u sinǰilel-ün uduridqal. Kökeqota: ÖMAKQ. .
 Svantesson, Jan-Olof, Anna Tsendina, Anastasia Karlsson, Vivan Franzén. 2005. The Phonology of Mongolian. New York: Oxford University Press. .

Banners of Inner Mongolia